Lagoa Bonita do Sul is a municipality in the state of Rio Grande do Sul, Brazil.

References

Municipalities in Rio Grande do Sul